James "Jimmy Mac" McElroy (1945 - 2011) was an Irish American mobster and racketeer from Manhattan, New York who was an enforcer for The Westies, a criminal organization that operated out of Hell's Kitchen.

Biography

Jimmy McElroy was born in 1945 in the Hell's Kitchen, Manhattan area of New York City. He played hockey with many future Westies-aligned criminals at Hell's Kitchen Park and boxed at Boys & Girls Clubs of America with Eddie Cummiskey and eventually started burglarizing commercial buildings in Lower East Side, Manhattan and cargo from warehouses in West Side, Manhattan. 
He rose through the ranks of a group known for counterfeiting, extortion and murder during the 70's and 80's.

A former boxer turned drug dealer, McElroy was known for being the driver of the infamous "meat wagon" (a large van used by the mob to transport dismembered body parts). Under control of Jimmy Coonan he became the third highest-ranking member of the Westies during that time.

In 1990 he testified against John Gotti to get a reduction in his racketeering charges, stating that he acted on orders from the Gambino Boss when assaulting a Carpenter's Union official three blocks down from the Hudson River piers. Gotti was acquitted on all charges and McElroy spent the rest of his life in prison.

Death

In May 2011, McElroy died in federal custody. His body was transferred to New York where a funeral procession was held at The Church of the Holy Cross in the renamed Clinton neighborhood.

References

1945 births
2011 deaths
American gangsters of Irish descent
American gangsters
American people who died in prison custody
Mafia hitmen
People convicted of racketeering
People from Hell's Kitchen, Manhattan
Criminals from Manhattan
Gangsters from New York City
Westies (New York gang)
Prisoners who died in United States federal government detention